Mohammad-Amin Riahi (1 June 1923, Khoy – 15 May 2009, Tehran) was a prominent Iranian literary scholar of Persian literature, a historian, writer and statesman.  Apart from being one of the authors of Dehkhoda Dictionary and Encyclopædia Iranica, he was the author and editor of several well-known scholarly books. Mohammad-Amin Riahi received his PHD on Persian literature from Tehran  University
under the supervision of Badiozzaman Forouzanfar. Riahi is  best known for his scholarly works on Shahnameh and Ferdowsi, Hafiz, and the ancient iranian languages (especially Azari Language). He has produced critical editions of some of the major classical Persian texts such as Mersad-al-ebad and Nozhat-al-majalis. During a course of 60 years he published numerous scholarly articles, a selection of which are gathered in a volume titled Forty essays on language, literature and history of Iran.

Among numerous cultural positions he held during his career, Riahi was a professor of Tehran University, the founding member and later president of the Shahnameh Foundation (1971–1979), vice-chairman of the Iranian Academy of Literature and Arts, and Iranian Minister of Education (1979).

Selected bibliography
Critical Editions of old Persian books:
 Jahan-Nameh, Mohammad ibn Najib Bakran (1963)
 Meftah-al-Moamelat, Mohammad ibn Ayub Tabari (1970)
 Mersad-al-ebad, Najmeddin Razi (1973)
 Alamaraye Naderi, Mohammad-Kazem Marvi (1983)
 Nozhat-al-majalis, Jamal Khalil Sharvani (1996)

Literary and Historical research books:
 Kisai Marvazi, his life and poetry (1988)
 Poetry and thoughts of Hafiz (1988)
 Persian language and literature in Ottoman territory (1990)
 A History of Khoy (1993)
 Early sources on Ferdowsi and Shahnameh (1993)
 Ferdowsi, his life, thoughts and poetry (1996)
 Forty essays on language, literature and history of Iran (2000)

References

External links 
Some of Encyclopedic Articles:
 NOZHAT-AL-MAJĀLES in Encyclopædia Iranica 
 DĀYA, NAJM-AL-DĪN in Encyclopædia Iranica 

Iranologists
21st-century Iranian historians
Members of the Academy of Persian Language and Literature
Education ministers of Iran
Iranian literary scholars
Iranian literary critics
People from Khoy
University of Tehran alumni
Academic staff of the University of Tehran
1923 births
2009 deaths
Iranian expatriate academics
Shahnameh Researchers
Faculty of Letters and Humanities of the University of Tehran alumni
20th-century Iranian politicians